Tabanus petiolatus is a species of horse fly in the family Tabanidae. Unlike many Tabanus species, the colour pattern of male eyes is found in the larger, upper lenses - appearing as a dark, brown streak across the light coloured lens. Females of this species have uniformly coloured dark brown eyes. Often confused with Tabanus melanocerus or Tabanus trimaculatus.

Distribution
United States.

References

Tabanidae
Insects described in 1917
Diptera of North America